Passion Despair is a documentary film by Swiss filmmaker Steff Gruber. Gruber started shooting in 2005. The film premiered at the  Gdansk Dokfilm Festival 2011.

Overview

Steff Gruber's documentary film portrays the Swiss photographer Daniel Leuenberger, who lives in Moldova
and specialises in photographing girls aged between 9 and 14.

Daniel has caused much controversy with the photos of his models which he sells via the Internet. Daniel's critics base their argument above all on the fact that the majority of his customers are pedophiles.

Daniel Leuenberger too finds himself marginalised and pushed to the edge. In the film he talks about how he deals with his feelings, about prejudice and about his work as a photographer of girls. The film raises questions of how images are used and their effects in a world increasingly dominated by the media.

In addition to Daniel's work as a portrait photographer, the film concentrates on the daily struggle for survival of Moldovan families and life in the officially non-existent neighbouring state of Transnistria. The small state, in which half a million people live, is hermetically sealed off from the outside world. Police and secret service are omnipresent; any opposition is nipped in the bud. The film shows how the mostly fatherless families in these two countries find ways to survive.

Festivals 
Gdansk DocFilm Festival 2011

References

External links
 
 

Swiss documentary films
2011 films
Swiss independent films
2011 documentary films
2010s German-language films
Documentary films about photographers
Films directed by Steff Gruber
Documentary films about pedophilia